Thalay Sagar is a mountain in the Gangotri Group of peaks in the western Garhwal Himalayas, on the main ridge that lies south of the Gangotri Glacier. It is the second highest peak on the south side of the Gangotri Glacier (after Kedarnath), but it is more notable for being a dramatic rock peak, steep on all sides, and a famed prize for mountaineers. It is adjacent to the Jogen group of peaks, and has the lake Kedartal at its base.

Climbing history

For military and geopolitical reasons foreign climbers were not permitted into most of the Garhwal region until  the late 1970s.  Unusually for such a hard peak, the first exploration of the Kedar Ganga valley and Thalay Sagar by non-Indians resulted in an attempt was actually successful. It was first climbed on 24 June 1979 via the northwest couloir and ridge and thence across the shale band of the North Face by an Anglo-American team comprising Roy Kligfield, John Thackray, and Pete Thexton.

Since the first ascent, many other routes have been climbed on the peak, some of which have been testpieces of modern mountaineering. There have been at least 15 ascents by at least 9 different routes. The north face of the peak, in particular, has been climbed by 5 different routes, some more direct than others. The key difficulty in the direct routes is a notorious band of shale near the summit, which presents rotten and dangerous rock. The first route to climb directly through the shale band, instead of finishing on one of the ridges, was the Australian Route pioneered by Andrew Lindblade and Athol Whimp; it involves  of climbing and is graded VII 5.9 WI5. Their climb was awarded the Piolet d'Or in 1999.

The first ascent of the Thalay Sagar NE face to the SE ridge was made by the Dutch team of Melvin Redeker, Mike Van Berkel and Cas Van de Gevel. They climbed in an 11-day push from base camp to summit, including time spent waiting out bad weather. The Dutch climbers were the eighth team that reached the summit.

In 2008 the first successful Indian ascent was accomplished by Basanta Singha Roy the famous climber from Mountaineers Association Of Krishnanagar(MAK),West Bengal, India, along with three sherpas (Pemba sherpa, pasangh sherpa & Phurba sherpa).

On 22 July 2012 Tusi Das, a 28-year-old woman climber from Kolkata summited the peak. She was the sole climber in the five-member women's team from the Alipore-based Kolkata Albatross Adventure Society to reach the summit. It was the first woman ascent to Mt Thalay Sagar recorded so far.

References

Geography of Uttarkashi district
Mountains of Uttarakhand
Six-thousanders of the Himalayas